Loraine Township is one of twenty-four townships in Henry County, Illinois, USA.  As of the 2010 census, its population was 290 and it contained 122 housing units.

Geography

Adjacent townships
 Portland Township, Whiteside County (north)
 Prophetstown Township, Whiteside County (northeast)
 Yorktown Township (east)
 Alba Township (southeast)
 Atkinson Township (south)
 Geneseo Township (southwest)
 Phenix Township (west)

Cemeteries
The township contains these three cemeteries: Bowman, Kemmis and Loraine.

Major highways
  Illinois Route 92

Airports and landing strips
 Christmas Forest Airport

Demographics

School districts
 Annawan Community Unit School District 226
 Geneseo Community Unit School District 228
 Prophetstown-Lyndon-Tampico Community Unit School District 3

Political districts
 Illinois's 14th congressional district
 State House District 90
 State Senate District 45

References
 United States Census Bureau 2008 TIGER/Line Shapefiles
 
 United States National Atlas

External links
 City-Data.com
 Illinois State Archives
 Township Officials of Illinois

Townships in Henry County, Illinois
Townships in Illinois